The Taylorville Correctional Center  is a minimum-security state prison for men located in Taylorville, Christian County, Illinois, owned and operated by the Illinois Department of Corrections.

The facility was first opened in 1990, and has a working capacity of 1221.

References

External links 

 facility report from prison watchdog non-profit John Howard Association

Prisons in Illinois
Buildings and structures in Christian County, Illinois
1990 establishments in Illinois